Noskov (masculine) or Noskova (feminine) is a Russian surname. Notable people with the surname include:

Persons
Noskov
Maxim Noskov, Russian ice hockey player
Nikolai Noskov (born 1956), Russian singer
Serge Noskov (born 1956), Russian composer

Noskova
Linda Nosková (born 2004), Czech tennis player
Luiza Noskova (born 1968), Russian biathlete and Olympics gold medalist
Margarita Noskova (born 2002), Russian deaf snowboarder
Yana Noskova (born 1994), Russian table tennis player and Olympics competitor
Yekaterina Rozenberg (née Noskova; born 1980), Russian runner

See also
Nosek / Nosková, Czech surname

Russian-language surnames